Titus Verginius Tricostus Caeliomontanus was a Roman statesman who served as Consul in 496 BC. He was probably the (older) brother of Aulus Verginius Tricostus Caeliomontanus, consul in 494 BC.

Consulship and military campaigns
Titus Verginius Tricostus Caeliomontanus was the Roman consul in 496 BC, along with Aulus Postumius Albus Regillensis. Livy reported that it was the year of the Battle of Lake Regillus; Aulus Postumius Albus had abdicated his consulship and was named dictator. Dionysius of Halicarnassus reported that Titus Virginius had commanded a corps under the orders of the dictator at the Battle of Lake Regillus.

Events of 486 BC 
Titus, or possibly his brother Aulus, was listed by Festus, who in conjecture with the writings of Valerius Maximus, made it possible that Verginius was one of the military tribunes in 486 BC who was burned at the Circus Maximus by Publius Mucius Scaevola for conspiring with the consul Spurius Cassius Vecellinus.

Notes

References
  Tite-Live, Histoire romaine, Livre II, 21 sur le site de l'Université de Louvain ;
 Denys d'Halicarnasse, Antiquités romaines, Livre VI, 1-21 sur le site LacusCurtius.

5th-century BC Roman consuls
Tricostus Caeliomontanus, Titus